Les Forgerons (also known as The Blacksmiths) is an 1895 French short black-and-white silent documentary film directed and produced by Louis Lumière. Given its age, this short film is available to freely download from the Internet.

The film formed part of the first commercial presentation of the Lumière Cinématographe on 28 December 1895 at the Salon Indien, Grand Café, 14 Boulevard des Capuchins, Paris.

Production
As with all early Lumière movies, this film was made in a 35 mm format with an aspect ratio of 1.33:1. It was filmed by means of the Cinématographe, an all-in-one camera, which also serves as a film projector and developer.

Plot

Two men stand working as blacksmiths. The one on the left of the screen repeatedly hammers an anvil while the man on the right winds a device. The man of the left then removes the metal he was hammering and places it into a bucket of water. At the end of the film a third man walks onto the screen from the left, with a wine glass and bottle in hand, hands the glass to the smith at the anvil, and begins to pour him a drink.

References

External links
Complete video at The Lumiere Institute
 
 Les Forgerons on YouTube

1895 films
French black-and-white films
French silent short films
1890s short documentary films
French short documentary films
Films directed by Auguste and Louis Lumière
Black-and-white documentary films
1890s French films